Penstemon brevisepalus, commonly known as short-sepaled beardtongue, is an herbaceous plant in the plantain family. It is a perennial that produces pale lavender flowers in late spring.

It is native to the eastern United States, where it is restricted to the states of Kentucky, Tennessee, Virginia, and West Virginia. Its natural habitat is acidic woodlands, prairies, and rock outcrops (typically sandstone or shale).

This species was described to science in 1933 by botanist Francis W. Pennell, although it was subsequently included under Penstemon canescens or Penstemon pallidus  in later 20th century treatments. More recent botanists have elevated it back to the species level due to its morphological distinction and well-defined geographic range.

References

brevisepalus